Byun Chun-sa (Hangul: 변천사; born November 23, 1987, in Seoul) is a South Korean short track speed skater who won gold in the 3000m relay at the 2006 Winter Olympics.

References

External links
 
 
 

1987 births
Living people
South Korean female short track speed skaters
Olympic short track speed skaters of South Korea
Olympic gold medalists for South Korea
Olympic medalists in short track speed skating
Short track speed skaters at the 2006 Winter Olympics
Medalists at the 2006 Winter Olympics
Asian Games medalists in short track speed skating
Asian Games silver medalists for South Korea
Asian Games bronze medalists for South Korea
Short track speed skaters at the 2007 Asian Winter Games
Medalists at the 2007 Asian Winter Games
Speed skaters from Seoul
Korea National Sport University alumni
South Korean Buddhists
21st-century South Korean women